The 2014 Asia-Oceania Korfball Championship was held in Hong Kong with 10 national teams in competition, from August 17 to 23.

First round

Final round

Final standings

References

External links
IKF Asian Oceanian Korfball Championship - 2014

Asia-Oceania Korfball Championship
Korfball in Hong Kong
2014 in korfball